Rh family, B glycoprotein, also known as RHBG, is an ammonia transporter protein which in humans is encoded by the RHBG gene.

Function 

RHBG and RHCG are non-erythroid members of the Rhesus (Rh) protein family that are mainly expressed in the kidney and belong to the methylammonium-ammonium permease/ammonia transporters superfamily. Rh family proteins are all predicted to be transmembrane proteins with 12 membrane spanning domains and intracytoplasmic N- and C-termini.

References

Further reading

Solute carrier family